This is a list of the Indonesian provinces by highest point, including DKI Jakarta. The highest point in Indonesia is Puncak Jaya, in Central Papua, at 4,884 metres (16,024 feet), which ranks the country as 28th by highest point. Several of the peaks in the list are unnamed, and are better known by the mountain range in which they are located:

Highest points

See also 
 Geography of Indonesia

References 

Highest point
Indonesian provinces
Mountains of Indonesia